The arrondissement of Dreux is an arrondissement of France in the Eure-et-Loir department in the Centre-Val de Loire region. It has 108 communes.

Composition

The communes of the arrondissement of Dreux, and their INSEE codes, are:

 Abondant (28001)
 Allainville (28003)
 Anet (28007)
 Ardelles (28008)
 Aunay-sous-Crécy (28014)
 Beauche (28030)
 Berchères-sur-Vesgre (28036)
 Bérou-la-Mulotière (28037)
 Boissy-en-Drouais (28045)
 Boissy-lès-Perche (28046)
 Boncourt (28050)
 Le Boullay-les-Deux-Églises (28053)
 Le Boullay-Mivoye (28054)
 Le Boullay-Thierry (28055)
 Boutigny-Prouais (28056)
 Bréchamps (28058)
 Brezolles (28059)
 Broué (28062)
 Bû (28064)
 La Chapelle-Forainvilliers (28076)
 La Chapelle-Fortin (28077)
 Charpont (28082)
 Châtaincourt (28087)
 Châteauneuf-en-Thymerais (28089)
 Les Châtelets (28090)
 Chaudon (28094)
 La Chaussée-d'Ivry (28096)
 Cherisy (28098)
 Coulombs (28113)
 Crécy-Couvé (28117)
 Croisilles (28118)
 Crucey-Villages (28120)
 Dampierre-sur-Avre (28124)
 Digny (28130)
 Dreux (28134)
 Écluzelles (28136)
 Escorpain (28143)
 Faverolles (28146)
 Favières (28147)
 La Ferté-Vidame (28149)
 Fessanvilliers-Mattanvilliers (28151)
 Fontaine-les-Ribouts (28155)
 La Framboisière (28159)
 Garancières-en-Drouais (28170)
 Garnay (28171)
 Germainville (28178)
 Gilles (28180)
 Goussainville (28185)
 Guainville (28187)
 Havelu (28193)
 Jaudrais (28200)
 Lamblore (28202)
 Laons (28206)
 Lormaye (28213)
 Louvilliers-en-Drouais (28216)
 Louvilliers-lès-Perche (28217)
 Luray (28223)
 Maillebois (28226)
 La Mancelière (28231)
 Marchezais (28235)
 Marville-Moutiers-Brûlé (28239)
 Le Mesnil-Simon (28247)
 Le Mesnil-Thomas (28248)
 Mézières-en-Drouais (28251)
 Montigny-sur-Avre (28263)
 Montreuil (28267)
 Morvilliers (28271)
 Néron (28275)
 Nogent-le-Roi (28279)
 Ormoy (28289)
 Ouerre (28292)
 Oulins (28293)
 Les Pinthières (28299)
 Prudemanche (28308)
 La Puisaye (28310)
 Puiseux (28312)
 Les Ressuintes (28314)
 Revercourt (28315)
 Rohaire (28316)
 Rouvres (28321)
 Rueil-la-Gadelière (28322)
 Saint-Ange-et-Torçay (28323)
 Sainte-Gemme-Moronval (28332)
 Saint-Jean-de-Rebervilliers (28341)
 Saint-Laurent-la-Gâtine (28343)
 Saint-Lubin-de-Cravant (28346)
 Saint-Lubin-de-la-Haye (28347)
 Saint-Lubin-des-Joncherets (28348)
 Saint-Lucien (28349)
 Saint-Maixme-Hauterive (28351)
 Saint-Ouen-Marchefroy (28355)
 Saint-Rémy-sur-Avre (28359)
 Saint-Sauveur-Marville (28360)
 La Saucelle (28368)
 Saulnières (28369)
 Saussay (28371)
 Senantes (28372)
 Senonches (28373)
 Serazereux (28374)
 Serville (28375)
 Sorel-Moussel (28377)
 Thimert-Gâtelles (28386)
 Tremblay-les-Villages (28393)
 Tréon (28394)
 Vernouillet (28404)
 Vert-en-Drouais (28405)
 Villemeux-sur-Eure (28415)
 Villiers-le-Morhier (28417)

History

The arrondissement of Dreux was created in 1800.

As a result of the reorganisation of the cantons of France which came into effect in 2015, the borders of the cantons are no longer related to the borders of the arrondissements. The cantons of the arrondissement of Dreux were, as of January 2015:

 Anet
 Brezolles
 Châteauneuf-en-Thymerais
 Dreux-Est
 Dreux-Ouest
 Dreux-Sud
 La Ferté-Vidame
 Nogent-le-Roi
 Senonches

References

Dreux